John Bröcheler (born 21 February 1945) is a Dutch operatic baritone who began as a concert singer, specialising in contemporary music such as the world premiere of Mauricio Kagel's Mare Nostrum. His appearance at De Nederlandse Opera in Donizetti's Maria Stuarda alongside Joan Sutherland was followed by an international operatic career, performing for example as Mandryka in Arabella by Richard Strauss, and again in world premieres such as Menotti's La Loca at the New York City Opera and the complete version of Henze's König Hirsch at the Staatsoper Stuttgart.

Life 
Born in Vaals, Bröcheler became a member of the men's choir Het Koninklijk Mannenkoor Cecilia 1837 in 1961, where he performed solo parts beginning with Die zwölf Räuber at age 17. He studied voice at the Conservatorium Maastricht with Leo Ketelaars and later in Paris with Pierre Bernac. He achieved first prize at the 1969 Landelijk Concours van Nederlandse Vocalisten in 's-Hertogenbosch.

Bröcherler gave a recital in Utrecht in 1966, dedicated to contemporary works. In 1974, he took part in the world premiere of Henri Pousseur's Die Erprobung des Petros Hebraicus at the Berliner Festwochen festival, followed a year later by the world premiere of Mauricio Kagel's Mare Nostrum there.

He made his operatic debut in 1973 at De Nederlandse Opera as Sid in Britten's Albert Herring. He performed the role of Talbot in Donizetti's Maria Stuarda, alongside Joan Sutherland in the title role. He appeared in leading roles such as Mozart's Don Giovanni, Germont in Verdi's La traviata, Marcello in Puccini's La bohème and Mandryka in Arabella by Richard Strauss. He also performed the latter role at the 1984 Glyndebourne Festival.

From 1977, he appeared in the United States, first at the San Diego Opera, as Ford in Verdi's Falstaff, staged by Tito Capobianco, and as Sharpless in Puccini's Madama Butterfly. He performed in the world premiere of Menotti's La Loca in San Diego and at the New York City Opera, alongside Beverly Sills in the title role.  He appeared as Verdi's Nabucco with Grace Bumbry als Abigaille at the Los Angeles Opera and in Toronto. In Hamlet by Ambroise Thomas, he performed with Sutherland as Ophelia.

In Germany, Bröcheler appeared as the Statthalter in the completed version of Henze's König Hirsch at the Staatsoper Stuttgart in 1985, conducted by Dennis Russell Davies. A recorded excerpt from the third act was later used for the series , with Julia Conwell as the Girl and Helmut Holzapfel as the King. The same year, he first sang at La Scala in Milan: Jochanaan in Salome by Richard Strauss, then Orest in Elektra, and Golo in Debussy's Pelléas et Mélisande.

Bröcheler recorded Schumann's Dichterliebe with pianist Tan Crone, which was awarded the Preis der deutschen Schallplattenkritik.

In 2002, he appeared at De Nederlandse Opera as Dr. Schön in Alban Berg's Lulu, alongside Anja Silja, with the Nederlands Philharmonisch Orkest conducted by Hartmut Haenchen.

Awards 
In 2005, Bröcheler became a Ridder of the Orde van de Nederlandse Leeuw.

Literature 

References

External links 
 
 
 John Bröcheler (Bass-Baritone) Bach Cantatas Website
 John Bröcheler, Een leven lang zingen, filmdocumentaire, Omroep Limburg, 2007
 Beste jarige: Toespraken voor Wagner (in Dutch) operamagazine.nl 21 May 2013

Dutch baritones
20th-century Dutch male opera singers
1945 births
Living people
Knights of the Order of the Netherlands Lion
21st-century Dutch male opera singers